Herb is a 2007 South Korean drama film, directed by Heo In-moo. Kang Hye-jung stars in the lead role as a 20-year-old woman with the mental and emotional skills of a seven-year-old, who falls in love with a policeman she sees as her Prince Charming, but must face tragedy when she is forced to deal with certain realities about herself and those around her.

Plot
Sang-eun is a pretty 20-year-old girl, that is warm hearted and possess an extraordinary gift for folding paper into various figures. She has a loving mom and friends, but she is also mentally challenged. She has the intelligence of a 7 years old. Sang-Eun learns everything slowly, but there are still a lot of things she does not know about. She is fixated with the idea that she will meet the prince of her dreams, like in the fairy tales she so often reads.

One day Sang-Eun meets a traffic officer, that she believes may be the prince of her dreams. The traffic officer is named Jong Bum and he has a strong penchant for beautiful woman. He mistakenly believes Sang-Eun to be a lawyer and approachers her. Once Jong Bum realizes that she is mentally challenged he leaves.

Sang-Eun returns home only to find her mom crying. Her mom has just returned from a hospital appointment. Sang-Eun, while she places things into boxes and wraps by year, is now worried that her mom may soon go away like her friend's grandmother did.

Cast 
 Kang Hye-jung ... Sang-eun
 Bae Jong-ok ... Sang-eun's mother
 Jung Kyung-ho ... Jong-bom
 Lee Mi-young ... Mi-ja
 Lee Won-jong
 Lee Young-yoo ... Young-ran
 Woo Seung-yeon

References

External links 
 
 

2007 films
2007 drama films
2000s Korean-language films
South Korean drama films
2000s South Korean films